Vélez Sársfield may refer to:
Club Atlético Vélez Sarsfield, an Argentine sports club best known for its football team
José Amalfitani Stadium, the club's stadium, sometimes called "Vélez Sarsfield stadium"
Dalmacio Vélez Sarsfield, Argentine jurist and editor of the Civil Code of Argentina
Vélez Sársfield (barrio), a barrio in the Western part of Buenos Aires